Koz Behram Dheri is a town and union council in Charsadda District of Khyber-Pakhtunkhwa.

References

Union councils of Charsadda District
Populated places in Charsadda District, Pakistan